Thomas Joseph Tedesco (July 3, 1930 – November 10, 1997) was an American guitarist and studio musician in Los Angeles and Hollywood. He was part of the loose collective of the area's leading session musicians later popularly known as The Wrecking Crew, who played on thousands of studio recordings in the 1960s and 1970s, including several hundred Top 40 hits.

Tedesco's playing credits include the theme from television's Bonanza, The Twilight Zone, Vic Mizzy's theme from Green Acres, M*A*S*H, Batman, and Elvis Presley's '68 Comeback Special. Tedesco was shown on-camera in a number of game and comedy shows, and played ex-con guitarist Tommy Marinucci, a member of Happy Kyne's Mirth-Makers, in the 1977-78 talk-show spoof Fernwood 2 Night and America 2 Night.

Career
Born in Niagara Falls, New York, Tedesco moved to the West Coast where he became one of the most-sought-after studio musicians between the 1960s and 1980s. Although he was primarily a guitar player, he also played mandolin, ukulele, sitar and over twenty other stringed instruments.

Tedesco was described by Guitar Player magazine as the most recorded guitarist in history, having played on thousands of recordings, many of which were top 20 hits. He recorded with most of the top musicians working in the Los Angeles area including the Beach Boys, the Mamas & the Papas, the Everly Brothers, the Association, Barbra Streisand, Jan and Dean, the 5th Dimension, Elvis Presley, Sam Cooke, Ella Fitzgerald, Frank Zappa, Ricky Nelson, Cher, and Nancy and Frank Sinatra as well as on Richard Harris's classic "MacArthur Park". His playing can be found on Jack Nitzsche's "The Lonely Surfer", on Wayne Newton's version of "Danke Schoen", B. Bumble and the Stingers's "Nut Rocker", the Rip Chords' "Hey Little Cobra", the Ronettes' "Be My Baby", the Sandpipers' "Guantanamera", the T-Bones' "No Matter What Shape'" and Nino Tempo & April Stevens' version of "Deep Purple". For Guitar Player, Tedesco wrote a regular column called "Studio Log" in which he would describe a day's work recording a movie, TV show or album, the special challenges each job posed and how he solved them, what instruments he used, and how much money he made on the job.

Tedesco also performed on film soundtracks such as The French Connection, The Godfather, Jaws, The Deer Hunter, Field of Dreams, Gloria plus several Elvis Presley films. He was also the guitarist for the Original Roxy cast of The Rocky Horror Show. Additionally, he performed the opening guitar solo for the Howard Hawks and John Wayne film Rio Lobo. He was one of the very few sidemen credited for work on animated cartoons for The Ant and the Aardvark cartoons (1968–1971).

As a solo artist, Tedesco recorded a number of jazz guitar albums, but his musical career ended in 1992 when he suffered a stroke that resulted in partial paralysis. The following year he published his autobiography, Confessions of a Guitar Player.

Tedesco died of lung cancer in 1997, at the age of 67, in Northridge, California. His son, Denny Tedesco (related to Damon Tedesco and Suzie Greene Tedesco), directed the 2008 documentary film The Wrecking Crew, which features interviews with Tommy and many of his fellow session musicians. The film finally saw theatrical release in 2015, after musical rights were cleared. Before that it had been screened only at film festivals, where clearance rights were not required.

Awards
In 2017, Tommy Tedesco was posthumously inducted into the Niagara Falls Music Hall of Fame.

Selected discography

As leader
 The Electric Twelve-String Guitar (Imperial Records, 1964)
 The Guitars of Tommy Tedesco (Imperial Records, 1965)
 Calypso Soul (Imperial Records, 1966)
 When Do We Start (Discovery, 1978)
 Autumn (Trend, 1978)
 Alone At Last (Trend, 1979)
 My Desiree (Discovery, 1981)
 Carnival Time (Trend/Discovery, 1983)
 Hollywood Gypsy (Discovery, 1986)
 Tommy Tedesco Performs Roumanis' Jazz Rhapsody for Guitar & Orchestra (Capri, 1992)

As sideman
With Paul Anka
 The Music Man (United Artists Records, 1977)
With Hoyt Axton
 Saturday's Child (Horizon, 1963)
With Joan Baez
 Gracias a la Vida (A&M Records, 1974)
With Chet Baker
 Blood, Chet and Tears (Verve, 1970)
With Stephen Bishop
 Careless (ABC Records, 1976)
With Sam Cooke
 Twistin' the Night Away (RCA Victor, 1962)
 Mr. Soul (RCA Victor, 1963)
With J. J. Cale
 Shades (Island Records, 1981)
With Terry Callier
 Turn You to Love (Elektra Records, 1979)
With The Crystals
 Twist Uptown (Philles, 1963)
With Bobby Darin
 Venice Blue (Capitol Records, 1965)
With Neil Diamond
 Serenade (Columbia Records, 1974)
With The 5th Dimension
 Up – Up and Away (Soul City, 1967)
 The Magic Garden (Soul City, 1968)
 Stoned Soul Picnic (Soul City, 1968)
 The Age of Aquarius (Soul City, 1969)
 Living Together, Growing Together (Bell, 1973)
With Don Ellis
 Haiku (MPS, 1974)
With Aretha Franklin
 Laughing on the Outside (Columbia Records, 1963)
With Michael Franks
 Michael Franks (Brut, 1973)
With Art Garfunkel
 Angel Clare (Columbia Records, 1973)
With Richard Harris
 A Tramp Shining (Dunhill Records, 1968)
With Quincy Jones
 The Hot Rock OST (Prophesy, 1972)
With Al Kooper
 Easy Does It (Columbia Records, 1970)
With Peggy Lee
 Mirrors (A&M Records, 1975)
With Kenny Loggins
 Celebrate Me Home (Columbia Records, 1977)
With Hugh Masekela
 Herb Alpert / Hugh Masekela (Horizon, 1978)
With Roger McGuinn
 Peace on You (Columbia Records, 1974)
With Maria Muldaur
 Waitress in the Donut Shop (Reprise Records, 1974)
With Walter Murphy
 Discosymphony (New York International, 1979)
With Anne Murray
 Anne Murray (Capitol Records, 1975)
With Michael Nesmith
 The Wichita Train Whistle Sings (Dot Records, 1968)
With Randy Newman
 Randy Newman (Reprise Records, 1968)
With Jack Nitzsche
 Heart Beat (Soundtrack) (Capitol, 1980)
With Van Dyke Parks
 Song Cycle (Warner Bros. Records, 1967)
With Billy Preston
 Greazee Soul (Soul City Records, 1963)
With Minnie Riperton
 Stay in Love (Epic Records, 1977)
With Johnny Rivers
 Changes (Imperial Records, 1966)
With Linda Ronstadt
 What's New (Asylum Records, 1983)
With Leon Russell
 Looking Back (Olympic Records, 1973)
With Sarah Vaughan
 Sarah Vaughan with Michel Legrand (Mainstream Records, 1972)
With Lalo Schifrin
 The Cincinnati Kid (soundtrack) (MGM, 1965)
 Music from Mission: Impossible (Dot, 1967)
 More Mission: Impossible (Paramount, 1968)
 Mannix (Paramount, 1968)
 The Fox (soundtrack) (MGM, 1968)
 Che! (soundtrack) (Tetragrammaton, 1969)
 Kelly's Heroes (soundtrack) (MGM, 1970)
 Enter the Dragon (soundtrack) (Warner Bros., 1973)
 Gloria (Columbia, 1980)

Bibliography

Videography
2008 The Wrecking Crew, a documentary put together by his son Danny Tedesco

References

External links

1930 births
1997 deaths
American jazz guitarists
Jazz fusion guitarists
Bebop guitarists
Musicians from Niagara Falls, New York
American session musicians
The Wrecking Crew (music) members
20th-century American guitarists
Deaths from lung cancer in California
Jazz musicians from New York (state)
American people of Italian descent
The T-Bones members